The Hundred of Nash is a cadastral hundred in the County of Kintore, South Australia on the southeastern fringe of the Nullarbor Plain spanning Fowler's Bay. The hundred was proclaimed in 1890 by Governor Kintore and named for a contemporary member of the state parliament, Benjamin Nash.

The land in the hundred is very sparsely populated. As such the hundred has never been subject to dedicated local government and the local community receive municipal services are provided by the Outback Communities Authority. Nash and its neighbouring hundred, Magarey, are within the bounded locality of Bookabie.

References

Nash
1890 establishments in Australia